Ashmeadiella is a genus of bees in the family Megachilidae. There are more than 60 described species in Ashmeadiella.

Species
These 68 species belong to the genus Ashmeadiella:

 Ashmeadiella altadenae Michener, 1936
 Ashmeadiella aridula Cockerell, 1910
 Ashmeadiella astragali
 Ashmeadiella australis (Cockerell, 1902)
 Ashmeadiella barberi Michener, 1939
 Ashmeadiella bequaerti Cockerell, 1931
 Ashmeadiella bigeloviae (Cockerell, 1897)
 Ashmeadiella biscopula Michener, 1939
 Ashmeadiella breviceps Michener, 1939
 Ashmeadiella bucconis (Say, 1837)
 Ashmeadiella cactorum (Cockerell, 1897)
 Ashmeadiella californica (Ashmead, 1897)
 Ashmeadiella cazieri Michener, 1939
 Ashmeadiella chumashae Griswold, 1985
 Ashmeadiella clypeodentata Michener, 1936
 Ashmeadiella cockerelli Michener, 1936
 Ashmeadiella coquilletti Titus
 Ashmeadiella crassa Cockerell, 1924
 Ashmeadiella cubiceps (Cresson, 1879)
 Ashmeadiella curriei Titus
 Ashmeadiella danuncia Ayala, Griswold & Vergara, 2015
 Ashmeadiella difugita Michener, 1939
 Ashmeadiella digiticauda Cockerell, 1924
 Ashmeadiella dimalla Michener, 1939
 Ashmeadiella echinocerei Cockerell
 Ashmeadiella erema Michener, 1939
 Ashmeadiella eurynorhyncha Michener, 1939
 Ashmeadiella femorata (Michener, 1936)
 Ashmeadiella floridana (Robertson, 1897)
 Ashmeadiella foveata Michener, 1939
 Ashmeadiella foxiella Michener, 1939
 Ashmeadiella gillettei Titus, 1904
 Ashmeadiella holtii Cockerell, 1898
 Ashmeadiella howardi Cockerell
 Ashmeadiella hurdiana (Michener, 1954)
 Ashmeadiella inyoensis Michener, 1939
 Ashmeadiella lateralis Michener, 1936
 Ashmeadiella leachi Michener, 1949
 Ashmeadiella leucozona Cockerell, 1924
 Ashmeadiella lutzi (Cockerell, 1930)
 Ashmeadiella mandibularis Ayala, Griswold & Vergara, 2015
 Ashmeadiella maxima Michener, 1936
 Ashmeadiella meliloti (Cockerell, 1897)
 Ashmeadiella micheneri Snelling, 1962
 Ashmeadiella microsoma Cockerell, 1924
 Ashmeadiella neomexicana (Cockerell, 1904)
 Ashmeadiella occipitalis Michener, 1939
 Ashmeadiella opuntiae (Cockerell, 1897)
 Ashmeadiella parkinsoniae Parker, 1977
 Ashmeadiella pronitens (Cockerell, 1906)
 Ashmeadiella prosopidis (Cockerell, 1897)
 Ashmeadiella rhodognatha Cockerell, 1924
 Ashmeadiella rubrella (Michener, 1949)
 Ashmeadiella rufipes Titus, 1904
 Ashmeadiella rufitarsis Michener, 1939
 Ashmeadiella salviae Michener, 1939
 Ashmeadiella sangrita (Peters, 1972)
 Ashmeadiella schwarzi Titus
 Ashmeadiella sculleni Michener, 1939
 Ashmeadiella sonora Michener, 1939
 Ashmeadiella stenognatha Michener, 1939
 Ashmeadiella stevensi Michener, 1937
 Ashmeadiella timberlakei Michener, 1936
 Ashmeadiella titusi Michener, 1939
 Ashmeadiella truncativentris Michener, 1951
 Ashmeadiella vandykiella Michener, 1949
 Ashmeadiella washingtonensis Michener
 Ashmeadiella xenomastax Michener, 1939

References

Further reading

External links

 

Megachilidae
Articles created by Qbugbot